T.I Ahmadiyya Secondary School is a secondary school in Freetown, Sierra Leone. In the country, the school is known for its academic output and for its production of sportsmen and women. It is one of the 55 Ahmadiyya secondary schools in the country.

Alumni and associates
 Victor Bockarie Foh (school's Economics and Government teacher) – current Vice President of Sierra Leone
 Samuel Sam-Sumana – former Vice President of Sierra Leone
 Zainab Bangura – former Foreign Minister of Sierra Leone; Special Representative of the UN Secretary General on Sexual Violence in Conflict
 Kemoh Sesay –  Minister of Political Affairs of Sierra Leone;  former Minister of Transportation and Aviation of Sierra Leone
Alhaji Alpha Osman Timbo - Former Minister of Labour and Industrial Relations

References

Secondary schools in Sierra Leone
Ahmadiyya educational institutions
Islamic schools in Sierra Leone
Schools in Freetown